X32 may refer to:

 X.32, an old ITU-T standard for connecting to an X.25 network by dial-up
 x32 ABI, a Linux and BSD Application Binary Interface
 ×32, a PCI Express connector slot
 x32, 32-bit computing
 Boeing X-32, a jet fighter aircraft
 X32 Digital Mixing Console, manufactured by Behringer

IA-32, the 32-bit version of the x86 architecture, commonly incorrectly referred to as x32 (64-bit architecture is known as x64)